MBUSO MLABA

 Mbuso Mlaba (14 born 1995), Entrepreneur from Adams Mission, South Africa.
 According to several sources, Mbuso Mlaba’s net worth is estimated to be around $1.1 million.
 He is considered as the youngest richest man in South Africa

Surnames of African origin